The eighth cycle of Holland's Next Top Model premiered on 31 August 2015 on RTL5. The panel from the show's previous cycle remained unchanged. The prizes for this cycle included a modelling contract with Touché Models valued at €50,000, an online feature in the style and fashion website Amayzine.com, and a brand new car.

The winner of the competition was 20 year-old Loiza Lamers from Driel, Gelderland. Lamers is the first ever transgender winner of the Top Model franchise.

Format changes
With the exception of the first two episodes, this was the first cycle of the show to be filmed entirely outside of the Netherlands. The contestants were flown to Los Angeles in episode two, and spent the remainder of the competition in the United States.

The winner of this years' wildcard competition was 19 year-old Laurie Kruitbosch from Apeldoorn. In contrast to the previous cycle's contest, the judges narrowed their selection down to the top ten applicants with the most votes from the public on the show's website.

Cast

Contestants
(Ages stated are at start of contest)

Judges
 Anouk Smulders (host) 
 Dirk Kikstra  
 May-Britt Mobach

Other cast members
 Fred van Leer

Episodes

Call-out order

 The contestant was disqualified
 The contestant was part of a non-elimination bottom two
 The contestant was eliminated
 The contestant was immune from elimination
 The contestant won the competition

Notes

References

External links
Official website

Holland's Next Top Model
2015 Dutch television seasons